Guraleus tokunagae is a species of sea snail, a marine gastropod mollusk in the family Mangeliidae.

Description

Distribution
This marine species occurs off Japan.

References

 Oyama, 1973. Revision of Matajiro Yokoyama's type Mollusca from the Tertiary and Quaternary of the Kanto area. Palaeontological Society of Japan, Special Papers, no. 17, pp. 1–48, pls. 1-57

External links
  University of Tokyo: Cenozoic Mollusca
 Kanagawa museum : List of fossil mollusca from the Upper Pleistocene Yokosuka Formation of Kanagawa Prefecture, Central Japan; Bull. Kanagawa prefect. , Mus. (Nat. Sc.)  nr. 37, 11–19, March 2009
 Worldwide Mollusc Species Data Base : Guraleus tokunagae

tokunagae
Gastropods described in 1926